Eadmuna is a genus of moths belonging to the family Mimallonidae.

Species
The genus includes the following species:

Eadmuna esperans (Schaus, 1905)
Eadmuna guianensis St Laurent & Dombroskie, 2015
Eadmuna paloa Schaus, 1933
Eadmuna pulverula (Schaus, 1896)

References

Mimallonidae
Ditrysia genera